Narenj Dul (also Romanized as Nārenj Dūl; also known as Nārenj Dūleh and Nārenjeh Dūl) is a village in Asalem Rural District, Asalem District, Talesh County, Gilan Province, Iran. At the 2006 census, its population was 585, in 127 families.

References 

Populated places in Talesh County